Henry of Mayenne or Henry of Lorraine, (Dijon, 20 December 1578 – Montauban, 20 September 1621) was a French noble from the House of Lorraine and more particularly from the House of Guise.

He  was the eldest son of Charles, Duke of Mayenne and Henriette of Savoy, Marquise of Villars.

He became Duke of Aiguillon in 1599 and in 1611, when his father died, Duke of Mayenne, Marquis de Villars, Count of Maine, Tende and Sommerive. He also became a peer of France and inherited the Hôtel de Mayenne in Paris.
He was also Grand Chamberlain of France.
He was present at the coronation of King Louis XIII of France.

In 1621, he was killed at the failed Siege of Montauban by a musket shot in the eye. He was buried in the church of Aiguillon.

He had married in Soissons in February 1599 with Henriette de Nevers (1571–1601), daughter of Louis Gonzaga, Duke of Nevers and Henriette of Cleves. They had no children.

He was succeeded by his sister's son Charles Gonzaga.

References

Sources

External links
 

1578 births
1621 deaths
House of Lorraine
House of Guise
Dukes of Mayenne
Dukes of Aiguillon
Grand Chamberlains of France
16th-century peers of France
17th-century peers of France
Peers created by Henry IV of France